Ken Murillo is a former racing driver from Santa Rosa, California. Murillo won the 1987 Barber Saab Pro Series and the 1988 Formula Super Vee USA Robert Bosch/Valvoline Championship. Murillow currently co-owns Michelin Pilot Challenge team Murillo Racing.

Racing career
Murillo started in the first season of the Barber Saab Pro Series. Murillo won eighth race at Watkins Glen International. While Willy Lewis won the championship Murillo ended up ninth in the 1986 Barber Saab Pro Series season. The Californian returned in the series the following year winning the first two rounds at Bicentennial Park and Road Atlanta. Murillo also won the race at Watkins Glen International. With three drivers winning three races the title chase was very close. But as Murillo outperformed Bruce Feldman and Jeremy Dale during the final round at Tamiami Park Murillo won the title.

After failing to obtain a racing seat in the American Racing Series for 1988 Murillo joined the Formula Super Vee. Murillo drove in the SCCA Formula Super Vee USA Robert Bosch/Valvoline Championship for Lee Hagen Racing. He raced his Volkswagen powered Ralt RT5 to victory at Phoenix International Raceway, Mid-Ohio Sports Car Course and Nazareth Speedway. Due to a strong last quarter of the season Murillo took the title over E.J. Lenzi.

Following his championships Murillo moved to Canada to race in the Formula Ford 2000. He finished consistently in the top five in his J.H. Racing Swift SE3 sponsored by George Lucas Films. The following year the American won the first race of the season at Mosport Park. After four more podium finished Murillo finished runner-up in the championship, behind Bobby Carville.

Murillo also made an appearance in the SCCA Escort World Challenge at Mosport Park. Together with Tod Gartshore, Charlie Henry and Ron Tambourine Murillo participated in the Toronto Star 24-Hour World Challenge. The Eagle Talon entered by Archer Brothers finished twelfth overall, sixth in class.

After failing to qualify for the Indy Lights race at Long Beach Murillo retired from professional auto racing.

Racing record

Formula Super Vee

American open–wheel racing results
(key)

Indy Lights

SCCA National Championship Runoffs

References

External links

Barber Pro Series drivers
People from Santa Rosa, California
Racing drivers from California
SCCA National Championship Runoffs winners
SCCA Formula Super Vee drivers
Formula Super Vee Champions